Dr. Graham C. Newbury (1910–1986) born in Point Pleasant, New Jersey, United States, was a general surgeon. The majority of his career was spent as Chief Surgeon at Overlook Hospital in Summit, New Jersey.

Education and residencies
Dr. Newbury was a graduate of Yale University School of Medicine and Trinity University in Hartford, Connecticut. He did residencies at Johns Hopkins University in Baltimore, as well as other hospitals in Boston and New York. His residencies were varied, including heart, brain and plastic surgery. Although he was invited in all residencies to remain as surgeon, he chose general surgery at Overlook.

Additional information
He was a noted resident of Lavallette, New Jersey where in his retirement he held a private practice with his wife Jane Cunningham Newbury, a nurse.

Jane Cunningham Newbury (1911–2001) born in Nova Scotia, Canada, was a psychiatric nurse. While Dr. Newbury was doing his residency in Boston, Mrs. Newbury graduated from Peter Bent Brigham Nursing School (affiliated with Harvard Medical School), also in Boston. She served as a scrub nurse for pioneer brain surgeon Dr. Harvey Cushing before taking a position at Silver Hill psychiatric hospital in New Canaan, Connecticut.

Newbury Academy
Newbury Academy alternative high school in Dumont, New Jersey was named in honor of the Newburys.

1910 births
1986 deaths
Yale University alumni
Johns Hopkins University people
American surgeons
People from Ocean County, New Jersey
People from Point Pleasant, New Jersey
Physicians from New Jersey
20th-century surgeons